The 1970 FIFA World Cup qualification UEFA Group 7 was a UEFA qualifying group for the 1970 FIFA World Cup. The group comprised Austria, Cyprus, Scotland and West Germany.

Standings

Matches

External links 
Group 7 Detailed Results at RSSSF

7
1968–69 in Austrian football
1969–70 in Austrian football
1968–69 in German football
1969–70 in German football
1968–69 in Cypriot football
1969–70 in Cypriot football
1968–69 in Scottish football
1969–70 in Scottish football